Mario De Bénédictis (born March 28, 1966) is Canadian born-Italian former professional ice hockey player who played for HC Varese, Rouen and Landsberg EV in European leagues.  Upon returning to North America, he played in the semi-Professional hockey league in the province of Quebec.

Career statistics

References

External links

1966 births
Living people
Italian ice hockey right wingers
Ice hockey people from Montreal
Bolzano HC players
Longueuil Chevaliers players
Drummondville Voltigeurs players
HC Varese players
Dragons de Rouen players
EV Landsberg players
SG Cortina players
Verdun Dragons players